Division 1, Newfoundland and Labrador is a census division covering the entire Avalon Peninsula including the Isthmus of Avalon of the Canadian province of Newfoundland and Labrador. Like all census divisions in Newfoundland and Labrador, but unlike the census divisions of some other provinces, the division exists only as a statistical division for census data, and is not a political entity.

The area has the largest population of the province, totaling 270,348 – 52% of the provincial total – in 2016. The total land area is 9,220.61 square kilometres. The coast of the Avalon Peninsula is characterized by four main bays and a number of smaller bays. The four main bays are; Trinity Bay, Conception Bay, St. Mary's Bay and Placentia Bay. The largest bay is Placentia Bay.

The capital St. John's, of the province is located in this division along with the second largest of the three cities of the province, Mount Pearl. The majority of the towns and villages are located along the coast in much of the four main bays as mentioned.

Incorporated Communities

Cities
Mount Pearl
St. John's

Towns

Unorganized subdivisions

Demographics

See also
List of communities in Newfoundland and Labrador

References

External links
 

001